is a railway station located in the city of Ichinoseki, Iwate Prefecture, Japan, operated by the East Japan Railway Company (JR East).

History
Geibikei Station opened on November 1, 1986. The station was absorbed into the JR East network upon the privatization of the Japanese National Railways (JNR) on April 1, 1987.

Lines
Geibikei Station is served by the Ōfunato Line, and is located 23.3 rail kilometers from the terminus of the line at Ichinoseki Station.

Layout
Geibikei Station has one side platform serving a single bi-directional track. There is no station building. The station is unattended.

Surrounding area
 Geibikei Gorge
 Yūben Cave

See also
 List of railway stations in Japan

External links

  

Railway stations in Iwate Prefecture
Ōfunato Line
Railway stations in Japan opened in 1986
Ichinoseki, Iwate
Stations of East Japan Railway Company